The NAMM Oral History Program is a collection of one-on-one interviews with people involved in the music products industry, including music instrument retailers, instrument and product creators, suppliers and sales representatives, music educators and advocates, publishers, live sound and recording pioneers, innovators, founders, and artists. The mission of the program is to preserve the history of the music products industry, including industry innovations, the evolution of musical instruments and music retail, as well as improving music education worldwide. The program was established by the National Association of Music Merchants (NAMM) in 2000.

History 
The program was founded in 2000 with Daniel Del Fiorentino as the lead interviewer. Fiorentino had worked at NAMM since 1998 as the first curator of the NAMM Foundations Museum of Making Music before becoming the NAMM Music Historian. The NAMM Resource Center, which curates the program, was approved by the NAMM Board of Directors in 1996, five years before the association's 100th anniversary. The first NAMM Oral History was conducted on March 5, 2000, with professional harmonica player, Bill Walden.

Purpose 
The NAMM Oral History program seeks to capture one-on-one interviews with those involved with the music products industry to cover innovative creations, the evolution of musical instruments, and music retail, for the purpose of improving music education around the globe. Among those interviewed as part of this collection include but are not limited to music retailers, manufacturers, arrangers, and composers, designers, as well as music publishers, engineers, and artists closely associated with the industry. Participants have come from over 80 different countries and all 50 U.S. states who have been born between 1903 and 2001.

The collection also includes the stories of those who have inspired others to make music. As a result, interviews with innovators such as Hartley Peavey and Remo Belli have been captured. In addition, the stories of these and similar companies have their histories archived through the use of those associated with the companies including person(s) in roles such as musicians, composers, method book authors, factory workers and salesman. The collection also includes music retailers and the history of such store chains as Sam Ash and Guitar Center, as well as independent music stores around the world such as Daynes Music and Andertons Music Co. The first music retailer interviewed for the collection was Chip Averwater of Amro Music in 2000. Over the years the scope of the Collection has expanded to include live sound mixing and professional audio pioneers, such as Al Schmitt and George Massenburg, whose involvement with professional audio equipment and recording studios has helped the industry grow.

The Oral History Collection Milestones
The NAMM Oral History Collection was also proud to add the first female to the collection in 2001 with the addition of music retailer, Luella Derwin. The first international interview occurred in 2001 and was with Ikutaro Kakehashi, who sat down multiple other times for follow-up interviews. Later, the depth of the international collection was expanded with the addition of interviews with Mr. and Mrs. Tom Lee of Tom Lee Music in Hong Kong. These interviews expanded the collection into a diverse, global representation of the music products industry, which now includes over a thousand music makers and industry leaders from around the world. These include Tommy Roe, Clifford Cooper, founder of the Orange Music Electronic Company, Hirotaka Kawai, a key figure in the Kawai Musical Instruments Manufacturing Company, Vera May, who is associated with Maton, Emily Achieng Akuno, a president for the International Music Council, and Tsutomu Katoh, co-founder of Korg.

1st: Bill Walden, professional harmonica player was interviewed in March 2000
100th: Seymour Duncan, Seymour Duncan founder was interviewed in July 2002
500th: Danny Rocks, music publisher was interviewed in July 2005
1,000th: Dennis Houlihan, Roland Corp. president was interviewed in June 2008
2,000th: Tom Schmitt, Schmitt Music president was interviewed in January 2013
3,000th: Chick Corea, jazz musician and music advocate was interviewed in August 2016
4,000th: Helen Meyer, Meyer Sound Laboratories co-Founder was interviewed in August 2019
5,000th: Kevin McGinty, audio engineer for the Grand Ole Opry was interviewed September 2022

The NAMM Oral History Service Award 

The NAMM Oral History Service Award was established in 2011 and recognizes the major contributions of those who have been interviewed themselves and who have strongly supported the program by providing historical context and suggesting others to be included. The award is presented at the NAMM Show each year by the NAMM CEO and the NAMM Music Historian. The list of winners is as follows:
 
2011: George Gruhn
2012: Keith Mardak
2013: Dennis Houlihan
2014: Jim Funada
2015: Madeline Crouch
2016: Ernie Lansford
2017: Craig Smith
2018: Bernie Capicchiano
2019: Harold “Hap” Kuffner
2020: Robert Wilson
2021: Gerhard Meinl
2022: Larry Morton

References

External links 

Oral history
Music history